Neu Wulmstorf is a railway station in northwestern Germany. The station is situated in the municipality of Neu Wulmstorf on the Cuxhaven to Hamburg Niederelbebahn railway line. The station was built on an enclave of land belonging to Daerstorf and thus was called Daerstorf until Daerstorf joint the municipality of Neu Wulmstorf in 1970.

Station layout 
Neu Wulmstorf is an at-grade station with two side platforms and 2 tracks. Connection to buses and parking is available.

Services

Trains of the Hamburg S-Bahn line S3 serve the station since 2007.

Before 2007 regular commuter trains from Stade and regional trains from Cuxhaven to Hamburg called at the station. This included the Bremerhaven to Hamburg-Neugraben service, which was operated by EVB, and metronom service.

See also  

 Hamburger Verkehrsverbund (HVV)
 List of Hamburg S-Bahn stations

References

External links 

Hamburg S-Bahn stations in Lower Saxony
Eisenbahnen und Verkehrsbetriebe Elbe-Weser
Buildings and structures in Harburg (district)
Railway stations in Germany opened in 1881